Walter Morrell Curry, Jr. (born June 18, 1981) is a former gridiron football defensive tackle. He most recently played for the Orlando Predators of the Arena Football League. He was signed by the Baltimore Ravens as an undrafted free agent in 2005. He played college football at  Albany State University.

Curry was also a member of the San Francisco 49ers, San Jose SaberCats of the Arena League, Toronto Argonauts, and Edmonton Eskimos.

Early years
Curry attended Crescent City High School in Crescent City, Florida and was a letterman in football and basketball.

References

External links
Just Sports Stats
Jacksonville Jaguars bio

1981 births
Living people
African-American players of Canadian football
Albany State Golden Rams football players
American football defensive ends
American football defensive tackles
American players of Canadian football
Baltimore Ravens players
Berlin Thunder players
Canadian football defensive linemen
Edmonton Elks players
Jacksonville Jaguars players
Orlando Predators players
People from Crescent City, Florida
Players of American football from Florida
Rhein Fire players
San Francisco 49ers players
San Jose SaberCats players
Toronto Argonauts players
Omaha Nighthawks players
21st-century African-American sportspeople
20th-century African-American people